Smart Village is a concept adopted by national, state and local governments of India, as an initiative focused on holistic rural development, derived from Mahatma Gandhi's vision of Adarsh Gram (Ideal Village) and Swaraj (Self Reliance). Prime Minister Narendra Modi launched Sansad Adarsh Gram Yojana (SAGY) or SAANJHI) on 2 October 2014, Gandhi's birthday, in addition to Smart Cities and Digital India, as a development programme for India. The Parliamentarian's Model Village Scheme main goal is for each Member of Parliament and Minister to adopt a rural village and develop it into a model by 2019 under the SAGY guidelines. The vision of SAGY is an integrated village development plan, encompassing Personal, Human, Social, and Economic dimensions.

Background
Smart Village India gets its foundation from Mahatma Gandhi's vision of Adarsh Gram (model village) and Gram Swaraj (Village self-rule/independence). Gandhi in two texts, Hind Swaraj and Gram (Village) Swaraj, promotes the concept of integrated rural development to impact majority of the population, as the primary initiative after India Independence in 1947.
The Eco Needs Foundation has initiated the concept of "Smart Village".  Under this project the Foundation is adopting villages and putting efforts for sustainable development by providing basic amenities like sanitation, safe drinking water, internal road, tree plantation, water conservation. The Foundation is also working for inculcating moral values in the society and for improving the standard of living of the villagers. In the concept of "Smart Village" the development of the village shall be based on the five paths Retrofitting, Redevelopment, Green fields, e-Pan, Livelihood. Under the concept of Smart Village, the Foundation has adopted Village Dhanora, Teh. Bari, District Dholpur, a small and remote village of Rajasthan to develop it as India's First Smart Village.  The village is situated 30 km away from Dholpur district headquarter and 248 km from Jaipur. The population of the village is about 2,000. The village was devoid of its basic needs like sanitation, internal roads. It was also facing various other similar problems such as lack of access to potable water, non-availability of water conservation system, encroachment on the roads, power fluctuation, non-availability of employment oriented education, unemployment and poverty, so on and so forth. Prof. Priyanand Agale Founder of Eco Needs Foundation and Dr. Satyapal Sing Meena (IRS) Joint commissioner of Income Tax has converted this idea into reality.Smart village"copyright is on the name of Prof.Dr.Priyanand Agale and Dr.Satyapal Sing Meena . smart village Dhanora has become role model of Rural Development. Dhanora village was also given an award by Prime minister of India Mr. Narendra Modi in the year 2018.

Implementation by states
The following states and territories participate in the programme.

References

Projects established in 2014
Modi administration initiatives